Euronat is a naturist holiday resort near the CHM Montalivet naturist resort, in Grayan-et-l'Hôpital, France.

After the success of CHM Montalivet, it was apparent that there was a need for even more capacity. This is reached on a boardwalk through protected dunes or by a roadway where there is parking near the beach. The whole area is naturist. Euronat opened in 1975. It is licensed for permanent residence.

It also has two mobile home park sections. It has a covered indoor heated swimming pool, a new outdoor pool, an outdoor slide pool, a large conference hall, and boasts a Thalassotherapy centre. The center includes fitness classes, a weight room with machines and free weights, although they are about 30 yrs old. There are services like massage, mud baths, seaweed treatments and the other latest beauty treatments.

Located near the camping section are basketball courts and tennis courts.

There are 25 shops in the shopping centre. These include a bakery, wine shop, a grocery store, a fish market, and a general merchandise shop.  Among its cultural offerings, Euronat has had a strong connection with Francois Malkovsky (1889-1982), a proponent of 'free dance'.  Also in the center is a pizzeria, seafood restaurant, French restaurant and ice cream stand.  A few bars complete the center.

According to the center's bylaws, users must adopt total nudity in all parts of Euronat, including the shopping mall.

References

External links
 
 

Naturist resorts
Nude beaches
Beaches of Metropolitan France
Landforms of Gironde
Naturism in France